Jacob Morris may refer to

 Jacob Morris (activist), New York City activist and public historian
 Jacob Morris (rugby union), English rugby union player
 Jacob Morris, member of the 23rd New York State Legislature

See also
 Jake Morris (disambiguation)
 Jacob Norris (disambiguation)